This is a list of Wildlife Management Areas in Nevada. The conservation goal is the protection of wetlands and waterfowl, including the use of WMAs for recreational hunting.

References

Wildlife Management Areas
 
Nevada